The Baton Rouge Blue Marlins, located in Baton Rouge, Louisiana and managed by Scott Bethea, were a professional baseball team in the All-American Association. Both the team and the league existed for only one season, 2001. They played their home games at Pete Goldsby Field. Their record was 44–28 in the regular season, and in the playoffs they beat the Albany Alligators in the semi-finals and the Fort Worth Cats in the championship three games to two.

Bethea, who also played for the team, was named the league's manager of the year.

Their attendance of 16,616 was fifth in the six team league.

References

 
Professional baseball teams in Louisiana
Defunct independent baseball league teams
Baseball teams established in 2001
2001 establishments in Louisiana
Sports clubs disestablished in 2001
2001 disestablishments in Louisiana
Defunct baseball teams in Louisiana